Flavia Nabugera Munaaba is a Ugandan politician. She is the current State Minister for the Environment in the Ugandan Cabinet. She was appointed to that position on 27 May 2011. She replaced Jessica Eriyo, who was dropped from the Cabinet. On account of being a cabinet minister, Flavia Munaaba is also an ex officio Member of Parliament.

External links
 Full of List of Ugandan Cabinet Ministers May 2011

See also
Cabinet of Uganda
Parliament of Uganda

References

Living people
Government ministers of Uganda
Members of the Parliament of Uganda
National Resistance Movement politicians
Year of birth missing (living people)